Fanged deer may refer to deer with downward-pointing canine teeth or tusks.
 Kashmir musk deer, a fanged deer in Afghanistan
Musk deer in general, inhabiting South Asia, East Asia, and Siberia
 Water chevrotain, a small nocturnal mouse-deer in western Africa
Water deer, a true deer native to China and Korea.

Animal common name disambiguation pages